Bibir Hat is the administrative center of Fatikchhari Upazila. It is a small municipality town in northern Chittagong and located on the Chittagong to Khagrachari highway. Its Mainly Small Bazar In Fatikchhari Municipality.

Populated places in Chittagong Division
Fatikchhari Upazila